Brendan Griffin (born 14 March 1982) is an Irish Fine Gael politician who has been a Teachta Dála (TD) for the Kerry constituency since 2016, and from 2011 to 2016 for the Kerry South constituency. He served as Deputy Government chief whip from July 2020 to December 2022 and as Minister of State for Tourism and Sport from 2017 to 2020.

Political career

Early political career
Griffin is a former member of Kerry County Council, representing the Dingle local electoral area from 2009 to 2011. He was the subject of controversy for hiring his wife Róisín as his secretarial assistant and his brother Tommy Griffin as his parliamentary assistant. Both these positions were filled without interview and have salaries paid for by the state. In addition, Griffin helped another cousin, Matt Griffin, get his old council seat. He takes half of his TD salary, at first giving the other half directly back to the exchequer and then in 2012 donating the other half of his salary to pay for a third teacher, in a small rural Kerry school. Griffin attended NUI Galway.

Dáil Éireann
In 2011, Griffin was selected on the Fine Gael ticket in Kerry South, along with incumbent TD Tom Sheahan. Griffin topped the poll with 8,808 first preferences votes, over three thousand more than his party colleague who poled 5,674. He was deemed elected to Dáil Éireann, after Count 5, soon followed by Tom Fleming and Michael Healy-Rae.

At the 2016 general election, Fine Gael had a disappointing result nationally, but Brendan Griffin improved his first-preference vote to 9,674, polling third in the combined Kerry constituency. This was the highest vote achieved by any Fine Gael candidate in Munster, as well as being the largest vote a Young Fine Gael candidate secured in Ireland. He was returned to Dáil Éireann, on the 11th Count, after his government colleagues Jimmy Deenihan and Labour's Arthur Spring were eliminated.

Calls for Taoiseach to step down
On 11 July 2016, Brendan Griffin did an interview with RTÉ News: Six One calling for Taoiseach Enda Kenny to step down as Leader of Fine Gael before the Dáil returned in September. Griffin was not backed by any other TD and a vote of confidence was not held. Griffin argued that Fine Gael showed a lack of preparedness for an election in the scenario where it arose.

Minister of State
Minister for Transport, Tourism and Sport Shane Ross had a toxic relationship with his first junior minister Patrick O'Donovan and when Leo Varadkar took over as Taoiseach he asked Ross if he wished for a replacement. Griffin was appointed as Minister of State at the Department of Transport, Tourism and Sport, with responsibility for Tourism and Sport. In his book In Bed with the Blueshirts Ross says that although they had very different positions, Griffin was a problem-solver and as such they worked well together; "His natural diplomacy will make him a superb Minister for Foreign Affairs some day", said Ross.

Later political career

At the general election in February 2020, Griffin was again re-elected in Kerry.
He was appointed as Deputy chief whip on 15 July 2020, and served until December 2022.

In 2022, Griffin called for a ban on all SUVs in the Dublin Bay South constituency, in response to what he described as "hare-brained proposals" regarding climate action.

On 31 January 2023, he announced that he would not be contesting the next general election.

References

External links

Brendan Griffin's page on the Fine Gael website

 

1982 births
Living people
Alumni of the University of Galway
Fine Gael TDs
Local councillors in County Kerry
Members of the 31st Dáil
Members of the 32nd Dáil
Members of the 33rd Dáil
Ministers of State of the 32nd Dáil